Peng Tso-kwei (born 8 February 1947) is a Taiwanese politician who served as head of the Council of Agriculture from 1997 to 1999.

Early life and education
Peng was born in Beipu, Hsinchu County, on 8 February 1947. He earned a bachelor's and master's degree in agriculture from National Chung Hsing University and completed on the school's track team. Peng completed a Ph.D from the University of Illinois. He then returned to NCHU as a professor.

Political career
Peng took office as head of the Council of Agriculture on 15 May 1997. In February 1998, Taiwan reached an agreement to join the World Trade Organization, but had to make adjustments unpopular with hog farmers, namely opening the nation's market to foreign meats. Peng announced short term losses for the agricultural sector in Taiwan, but vowed to aid livestock farmers. He had backed a first draft of revisions to the Agricultural Development Law as proposed in 1999, but pulled his support after the Council of Agriculture made further changes. The Kuomintang legislative caucus proposed another set of amendments, and Peng resigned his position on 6 December 1999 in protest. Peng's resignation was approved the next day and Lin Hsiang-nung was promoted as Peng's successor. After the KMT version of the bill passed the Legislative Yuan in January 2000, Peng released a statement critical of the newly promulgated law.

After the end of his tenure as head of the COA, Peng has written for the Taipei Times on the subject of agriculture. He is against the construction of housing on agricultural land, as well as the use of ractopamine in livestock.

Academic career
Peng's appointment as president of National Chung Hsing University drew controversy in September 2000, as he was accused of plagiarism and subsequently investigated. Despite opposition from faculty, he took office as the president of the institution in October 2000, only to be removed from office by the Ministry of Education in January 2001. Peng became president of TransWorld Institute of Technology in February 2001. He was named a department chair at  Taichung Healthcare and Management University in August 2003. In 2005, he began teaching at Asia University. He was named the president of Chung Chou University of Science and Technology in 2007. In 2010, Peng was succeeded by Hwang Jenq-Jye.

Personal
Peng is of Hakka descent. His daughter was the actress Cindy Yang. She committed suicide at her Taichung home on 21 April 2015, by inhaling helium.

References

External links

Living people
National Chung Hsing University alumni
University of Illinois alumni
Presidents of universities and colleges in Taiwan
Taiwanese politicians of Hakka descent
Academic staff of the National Chung Hsing University
Academic staff of Asia University (Taiwan)
1947 births
Taiwanese Ministers of Agriculture
Taiwanese agriculturalists